The Blood Run Site is an archaeological site on the border of the US states of Iowa and South Dakota. The site was essentially populated for 8,500 years, within which earthworks structures were built by the Oneota Culture and occupied descendant tribes such as the Ioway, Otoe, Missouri, and shared with Quapaw and later Kansa, Osage, and Omaha (who were both Omaha and Ponca at the time) people. The site was so named on account of the iron-stained soil.

History 

Arikara, Dakota, and Cheyenne were regular traders with the village and Nakota/Dakota and Arikara people also regularly resided there in later years. The site overlaps the Iowa and South Dakota border, near Sioux Falls, South Dakota, between Granite, Iowa, and Harrisburg, South Dakota.

Although declared a National Historic Landmark in 1970, its integrity is endangered by gravel quarrying and looting. The site was substantially looted and areas wholly destroyed by settlers and looters through the late 1930s and by subsequent generations of collectors. A possible snake mound rivaling the Serpent Mound in Ohio was used for railroad fill.

Blood Run was mapped in the early 18th century by French voyageurs trading with the village, which was then populated largely by Omaha people, but other cultures shared the area, about 480 mounds existed and a population of 10,000 Native people was documented in the corresponding census. In the late 19th century, 176 mounds were still visible. Today 78 mounds still exist, mostly burial. In 1987, the State of Iowa acquired a prominent portion of the site for a state park. The State of South Dakota Game, Fish, and Parks Commission, upon offer of land sale by owners Buzz and Lois Nelson and the sole civilian testimony by SD author of Blood Run (book) (a volume supported by a SD Arts Council Grant) and Sioux Falls Public Schools and Office of Indian Education teacher, Allison Hedge Coke, the Commission voted to acquire the area as state park land in January 2003. Doug Hofer was a supportive presence at the hearing.

In December of 2011, South Dakota Governor Dennis Daugaard announced that an agreement was reached on the purchase option for 324 acres in the Blood Run Historical Landmark area on the Lincoln County, S.D., side of the Big Sioux River. "South Dakota Department of Game, Fish and Parks, the Parks and Wildlife Foundation and The Conservation Fund to acquire the property for $3.5 million before the end of the year, according to the governor’s office." "The Conservation Fund will purchase and hold the majority of the Nelson property until funds are available and then transfer it to the state of South Dakota."

See also
Iowa archaeology
Indians of Iowa
Gitchie Manitou State Preserve
List of National Historic Landmarks in Iowa
List of National Historic Landmarks in South Dakota
National Register of Historic Places listings in Lyon County, Iowa
National Register of Historic Places listings in Lincoln County, South Dakota

References

Blood Run. Allison Hedge Coke. Salt Publications. 2006 UK. 2007 US.
The Ohio State University  College of Arts and College of Humanities. June 2009. Chadwick Allen, English, "Siting Earthworks in Allison Hedge Coke's Blood Run."  Plenary address, LitFest 2009, University of Dayton, March 28 
SD Parks & Wildlife Foundation.

External links 

State of Iowa page for site
1837 map
blood run map

Native American history of Iowa
Native American history of South Dakota
Archaeological sites on the National Register of Historic Places in Iowa
Archaeological sites on the National Register of Historic Places in South Dakota
National Historic Landmarks in Iowa
National Historic Landmarks in South Dakota
Former Native American populated places in the United States
Former populated places in Iowa
Former populated places in South Dakota
Protected areas of Lyon County, Iowa
Geography of Lincoln County, South Dakota
State Historical Society of Iowa
National Register of Historic Places in Lyon County, Iowa
Populated places on the National Register of Historic Places